Louise Noguchi (born 1958) is a Canadian multidisciplinary visual artist who uses video, photography, sculpture, and installation to examine notion of identity, perception and reality.

Early career
Louise Noguchi was born in Toronto, and received her MFA from the University of Windsor and AOCA from the Ontario College of Art in Toronto. She has been active in the Toronto art community since 1981.

Work
Her sculptural installation work in the 1980s dealt with the theme of the hunter. In 1999, she co-authored Compilation Portraits
with Kym Pruesse and Suzanne Luke (Robert Langen Gallery). In the 1990s, she explored the language of violence which is concealed in the Wild West mythology of rodeo cowboys, trick roping, sharp shooting, gun spinning and knife throwing. In her video Crack (2000), for instance, a cowboy's bull whip beheads a white flower, with one crack. (Crack and her other videos have been shown at the Art Gallery of Ontario).

More recently, she has looked to contemporary culture as a source for material, including her background as a Japanese descendant. In a series in 2013, Noguchi has taken archival digital prints of the Royal Ontario Museum's collection of Buddha heads that were broken or sawed off by thieves and vandals, but had been part of rock walls at various religious sites in China.

Selected exhibitions
Her work has been included in solo and group exhibitions across Canada and internationally. She has had a solo exhibitions titled Louise Noguchi: Selected Work 1982-85 at the Power Plant, Toronto (1989), at Oakville Galleries, and the Agnes Etherington Art Centre, Kingston (1999); at Birch Contemporary Gallery, Toronto (2005); at Centre A: Vancouver International Centre for Contemporary Asian Art and the Thames Art Gallery (2008), and participated in group shows at the Contemporary Art Gallery and the Canadian Embassy Gallery, Vancouver (1996); the Canadian Embassy in Tokyo, Japan (1996); Oakville Galleries, and the Canadian Museum of Contemporary Photography, Ottawa (1997-1999); Deutsches Museum, Munich (2002); the Art Gallery of Ontario, Toronto (2002 and 2016) (the Art Gallery of Ontario received a large-scale installation from the Canada Council Art Bank in the late 1990s and also put it on exhibition in 2005), with Stan Douglas in the Space of Making, Berlin (2005), and in the United States (2009). In 2020, she was in a group show titled Next Year's Country, linked with artists as seemingly distant as William Kurelek at Remai Modern, Saskatoon.

Selected solo exhibitions 
CEPA Underground (1997) (inaugural exhibition), Buffalo, USA

Modus Operandi (2 person exhibition with Ginette Legaré) (1999)

Compilation Portraits, Cold City Gallery, Toronto (1995)

I.A. (Industrial Arts) (1993)

Cold City, Toronto (1993)

Optica, Montréal (1993)

Forest City, London (1992)

Stride Gallery, Calgary  (1990)

South Albert Art Gallery (1990), Lethbridge,  Canada

Louise Noguchi: Selected Work 1982-1985 (1989), The Power Plant Gallery, Toronto, Canada

Out of the Garden...Into the Forest (1989), Carmen Lamanna Gallery, Toronto, Canada

Carmen Lamanna Gallery (1987), Toronto, Canada

Carmen Lamanna Gallery (1986), Toronto, Canada

We Draw to Kill the Beasts (1985), Carmen Lamanna Gallery, Toronto, Canada

Extensions of the Heart (1984), Carmen Lamanna Gallery, Toronto, Canada

Carmen Lamanna Gallery(1982), Toronto, Canada

Selected group exhibitions 
Crime and Punishment (1999), Agnes Etherington Art Centre, Kingston

La Face/The Face (1999) - Daizbao, Montreal

(Travelling Exhibition) Track Records: Trains and Contemporary Photography (1997-1999), Oakville Galleries, Oakville, Canadian Museum of Contemporary Photography, Ottawa, Presentation House and Contemporary Art Gallery, Vancouver, The Illingworth Kerr Gallery, Calgary, Centre culturel Université de Sherbrooke, MacKenzie Art Gallery, Regina, Winnipeg Art Gallery, Winnipeg

Rococo Tattoo (1997), Power Plant Gallery, Toronto

For Lack of Evidence (1996), Chateau de La Roche-Guyon, France

Textiles, That is to Say (1994), Museum for Textiles, Toronto, Or Gallery, Vancouver

The Today Show (1988), The Japanese Cultural Centre, Toronto

Drawing Out the Form: Sculpture Touched by Drawing (1987), The Nickle Art Museum, University of Calgary, Calgary, Alberta

Shikata Ga Nai (1987), Hamilton Artist Inc., Hamilton, Ontario (touring)

How We See (1986) - What We Say, The Art Gallery at Harbourfront, Toronto, Canada

Mapping the Surface (1986), Mendel Art Gallery, Saskatoon, Saskatchewan

Patio Lawn Slope (1986), University of Toronto, Scarborough Campus, Toronto

Art Cologne (1986), Rheinhallen of the Cologne Art Fair, Cologne, West Germany

Territories (1985), Eye Level Gallery, Halifax, Nova Scotia

The New City of Sculpture (1984), Studio 620, Toronto

Attitude (1983), Canada National Exhibition, Toronto

Women in Art (1982), Art Rental, Art Gallery of Ontario, Toronto

Carmen Lamanna Gallery (1981), Toronto

First Purchase (1981), The Art Gallery at Harbourfront, Toronto

Gallery 76 (1981), Toronto

Artventure (1980), Royal Bank Plaza, Toronto

The Funnel (film screening) (1980), Toronto

The Viewing Rooms (1979), New York, New York

Photoworks Gallery (1978), Toronto

Public collections
Noguchi's work is in the public collection of the Art Gallery of Ontario, Oakville Galleries; the Agnes Etherington Art Centre, Kingston; the Robert McLaughlin Gallery, Oshawa; and elsewhere. Louise Noguchi's work is represented by Birch Contemporary Gallery in Toronto.

Teaching
Since 2001, she has been a professor in the Art and Art History Program, a collaborative joint program between Sheridan Institute and the University of Toronto Mississauga where she teaches photography and performance-based art.

Publications 
Louise Noguchi: Recent Work, 1999, Oakville Galleries  ISBN  0-921027-86-9

Louise Noguchi, 2008, Centre A Vancouver International Centre for Contemporary Asian Art ISBN 978-0-9810100-2-1

Compilation Portraits - Louise Noguchi,1999, curated by Suzanne Luke, text by Kym Pruesse, Robert Langen Gallery, Wilfrid Laurier University ISBN 0-9685349-0-2

Louise Noguchi: Selected Works 1982–1985, 1989, Louis Dompierre, The Power Plant Gallery, ISBN 0-921047-38-X

Continuum Contemporary Canadian Sculpture Series - Louise Noguchi, 1991, Southern Alberta Art Gallery ISBN 0-921613-27-X

References

1958 births
Living people
Canadian video artists
Canadian sculptors
Canadian photographers
Canadian installation artists
Canadian women artists
OCAD University alumni
Canadian people of Japanese descent
Academic staff of the University of Toronto